Manolis Saliakas (born 12 September 1996) is a Greek professional footballer who plays as a right-back for 2. Bundesliga club FC St. Pauli.

Club career
Saliakas began his football career attending the Ergotelis Youth Academy, the youth system of his local Super League Greece club Ergotelis. Already capped with the Greece U17 national team, he was spotted by Olympiacos' scouts, who arranged his transfer to the Super League champions in the winter of 2013.

Olympiacos
Saliakas played little for Olympiacos and moved to Limassol-based side Karmiotissa on loan, who had been newly promoted to the Cypriot First Division. Having made 31 appearances, he returned to Greece joining Chania of the Football League Greece on a two-year loan. He scored seven goals in 50 games.

Lamia
On 12 July 2019, facing competition at Olympiacos for his playing position from Omar Elabdellaoui, Bruno Gaspar and Vasilis Torosidis, Saliakas moved to Lamia on a free transfer. He made 29 consecutive appearances in all competitions.

PAS Giannina
On 31 July 2020, he signed a contract with PAS Giannina in Ioannina. He played against Panathinaikos where he got into the semi-final of the Greek Cup in the season 2020–21. With the club of PAS Giannina he got 6th place in the season 2021–22 in Super League Greece becoming the club with most appearances in his career.

FC St. Pauli
In June 2022 he moved to FC St. Pauli.

International career
Saliakas made his debut for Greece national team on 3 June 2021 in a friendly against Belgium. He substituted Thanasis Androutsos in the 80th minute.

Career statistics

Honours
Olympiacos
Super League Greece: 2013–14, 2014–15, 2015–16
Greek Cup: 2014–15
Individual
Super League Greece Team of the Year: 2021–22

References

1996 births
Living people
Footballers from Heraklion
Greek footballers
Association football fullbacks
Greece international footballers
Greece youth international footballers
Greece under-21 international footballers
Super League Greece players
Olympiacos F.C. players
AO Chania F.C. players
PAS Giannina F.C. players
Greek expatriate footballers
Greek expatriate sportspeople in Cyprus
Expatriate footballers in Cyprus